Jijila is a commune in Tulcea County, Northern Dobruja, Romania. It is composed of two villages, Garvăn and Jijila.

References

Communes in Tulcea County
Localities in Northern Dobruja